Edsel is a masculine given name which may refer to:

Edsel Albert Ammons (1924–2010), American bishop of the United Methodist Church
Edsel Ford (1893–1943), president of Ford Motor Company and son of Henry Ford
Edsel Ford (poet) (1928–1970), American poet
Edsel Ford II (born 1948), Ford Motor Company executive and great-grandson of Henry Ford
Edsel Ford Fong (1927–1984), American restaurant server noted for his rudeness

Masculine given names